Duke George may refer to:

Grand Duke George of Russia (disambiguation), multiple people
George, Duke of Saxony, 1471–1539
Duke George Augustus of Mecklenburg, 1748–1785
Duke George of Oldenburg, 1471–1539
Georg Alexander, Duke of Mecklenburg, 1899–1963
Georg II, Duke of Saxe-Meiningen 1826–1914